New American Writing is an annual American literary magazine emphasizing contemporary American poetry, including a range of innovative contemporary writing. The magazine is published in association with San Francisco State University. New American Writing is published by OINK! Press, a nonprofit organization. The magazine appears in early June each year. It was first published in 1986.

Editors
The publication is edited by poets Paul Hoover, editor of Postmodern American Poetry, and Maxine Chernoff.

Contributors
John Ashbery, Robert Creeley, Charles Simic, Jorie Graham, Denise Levertov, Hilda Morley, August Kleinzahler, Ann Lauterbach, Ned Rorem, Wanda Coleman, Nathaniel Mackey, Barbara Guest, Marjorie Perloff, Michael Palmer, Lyn Hejinian, and Charles Bernstein.

Cover Art
Alex Katz, Robert Mapplethorpe, Jennifer Bartlett, Elizabeth Murray, and Fairfield Porter.

Other anthologies
Work from the magazine has appeared in the annual The Best American Poetry series and also in the annual Pushcart Anthology.

Special issues
 Supplement of Australian poetry edited by John Tranter (No. 4)
 Censorship and the Arts (No. 5)
 Supplement of innovative poetry from Great Britain edited by Ric Caddel
 Supplement of Brazilian poetry edited by Régis Bonvicino (No. 18)

See also

 List of literary magazines

References

External links
 

Annual magazines published in the United States
Magazines established in 1986
Magazines published in San Francisco
Poetry magazines published in the United States
San Francisco State University